The Buddha of Suburbia is a British four-part television serial, directed by Roger Michell, originally broadcast on BBC Two in November 1993. Based on the 1990 novel of the same name by Hanif Kureishi, the series starred Naveen Andrews as the main character, Karim Amir.  Its theme song, as well as other original music for the series, was written and performed by David Bowie (this work also inspired Bowie's related 'soundtrack' album of the same name).

Unable to find distribution in America, the series was given a limited engagement screening at The Public Theater in Manhattan from December 1994 to January 1995.

Overview
Karim Amir is a mixed-race 17-year-old who lives in a South London suburb during the 1970s. With an English mother and a Pakistani father, Karim is uncertain of his cultural identity. As his father becomes a kind of spiritual guru to the surrounding middle-class neighbours, Karim begins to explore his cultural roots with hopes that he will achieve sexual and racial self-realisation.

Cast

Production

Filming
Segments for the series were filmed at Naveen Andrews' old school Emanuel School. The extras used in the series were real punks, skinheads, suedeheads, hippies, and musicians cast by actress Barbie Wilde.

Music

The series features many songs from the seventies, as well as music written and performed specifically for the series by David Bowie. While a soundtrack album by Bowie was released under the same name on 8 November 1993, the music on the album is completely reworked, with the exception of the programme's theme song "The Buddha of Suburbia". A promotional music video was made for the song, featuring Bowie performing the song while strolling around the London suburb of Bickley as scenes from the series are intercut throughout. The rest of the original television soundtrack remained unreleased.

References

External links

British Film Institute Screen Online
The Buddha of Suburbia at the British Library - includes related articles, videos and items from Kureishi's archive

1993 British television series debuts
1993 British television series endings
1990s British drama television series
Serial drama television series
1990s British television miniseries
British Indian films
English-language television shows
BBC television dramas
BBC Film films
Films with screenplays by Hanif Kureishi
Television shows based on British novels
Television shows set in London
Television series set in the 1970s
Films shot in London